Khubzah is a village in the Al Bayda Governorate of Yemen.

History
On 11 August 2020 the city was recaptured from Islamic State by Houthi movement.

References

Populated places in Al Bayda Governorate